The Communauté de communes de Haute Picardie  is a former communauté de communes in the Somme département and in the  Picardie région of France. It was created in June 1994. It was merged into the new Communauté de communes Terre de Picardie in January 2017.

Composition 
This Communauté de communes included 26 communes:

Ablaincourt-Pressoir
Assevillers
Belloy-en-Santerre
Berny-en-Santerre
Chaulnes
Chuignes
Dompierre-Becquincourt
Estrées-Deniécourt
Fay
Fontaine-lès-Cappy
Foucaucourt-en-Santerre
Framerville-Rainecourt
Fresnes-Mazancourt
Herleville
Hyencourt-le-Grand
Lihons
Marchélepot
Misery
Omiécourt
Pertain
Proyart
Punchy
Puzeaux
Soyécourt
Vauvillers
Vermandovillers

See also 
Communes of the Somme department

References 

Haute Picardie